To Party Arhizei (Greek: Το πάρτυ αρχίζει; English: The party is starting) is the first official large-scale concert tour by Greek contemporary laïka and pop singer Helena Paparizou and first tour of Greece as a solo artist. The tour took place during the summer of 2008, and kicked off at the National Stadium in Kalamata on July 2, 2008, ending in Athens on September 19, 2008. The final concert at Theatro Vrahon in Athens was recorded, and released as a bonus DVD on Vrisko To Logo Na Zo: Deluxe Edition titled Live in Concert. Overall, the concert tour was a moderate success for Paparizou, with an audience total of approximately 192,000 over 29 concerts and one sold-out venue. Alpha TV broadcast the concert on television on December 30, 2008 as part of their holiday music schedule.

Background 
The 2008 tour was Paparizou's first large-scale tour of her career and first tour of Greece as a solo artist; she claimed she felt that she owed something to the Greek people. During the tour, Paparizou visited many cities all over the Greece for the first time as a solo performer (she had formerly visited some places as a member of Antique). Prior to the release of her album, Paparizou asked her fans to request their favorite songs that they would like to hear on the tour through her official Facebook page. Paparizou toured in all provinces of Greece, visiting both some large cities and many smaller towns and islands where she would not otherwise have the opportunity to perform. Manos Pirovolakis toured with her as the opening act. Other guest performers included hip-hop group Stavento who appeared in select venues. Paparizou came into collaboration with the group a few weeks prior when she made a featuring appearance during their performance at the 2008 MAD Video Music Awards, singing a chorus from their hit "Mesa Sou". The shows included songs from Paparizou's album Vrisko To Logo Na Zo and songs since the start of her solo career, as well as from her Antique recordings and covers and duets with Pirovolakis and Stavento. The kick-off party took place on June 25, 2008. During the tour, it was reported that ticket sales reached 190,000 after twenty-eight concerts. However, following the end of the tour Sony Music Greece printed the official attendance numbers of the tour, revealing that the 29 performances had a total attendance of approximately 192,000, averaging 6,620 tickets a show. The ticket sales of the planned 30th show were not included due to availability for refunds as the concert was cancelled due to bad weather conditions. The lowest attendances of the entire tour were on the islands of Chios and Kos with 3,500 attendants each, while Orestiada had the largest attendance of the tour with 18,000 people. Paparizou achieved five-figure ticket sales in three shows: Orestiada (18,000), Serres (12,000), and Patras (11,000), however, the audiences of the former two cities were joint in other events; Paparizou performed as a part of the Arda's Festival and commenced the Enduro World Championship respectively. Despite that she had higher attendance numbers in some other cities, she only managed to sell out the Thessaloniki venue with 7,500 spectators. Overall it was a moderate success; with ticket costs at €20, the tour should have grossed €3.84 million from ticket sales not including the cost of merchandise. Fokas Evangelinos, who choreographed Paparizou's Eurovision Song Contest 2005-winning performance of "My Number One", directed the choreography, while Paparizou teamed up with soft drink company Ivi as the main sponsor of her tour. Nokia was also a sponsor of the tour, as well as Alpha TV who reserved the rights to film and broadcast it; it was announced that the concert would be shown on Alpha TV in December as part of their holiday music schedule.

Guest appearances
 Manos Pirovolakis (opening act)
 Stavento (guest act, select venues)
 Giorgos Sabanis  (guest act, select venues)
 Paschalis Terzis  (guest act)

Set list

"Porta Gia Ton Ourano"
"An Eihes Erthei Pio Noris"
"I Kardia Sou Petra"
"The Game of Love"
"Panda Se Perimena"
"Iparhi Logos"
"Mambo!
"Alli Mia Fora"
"Papeles Mojados"
"Teardrops"
"To Fili Tis Zois"
"Agapi San Listia"
"Se Pion Na Miliso"
"Eisai I Foni"
"Mesa Sou" (Duet with Stavento)
"Anapandites Kliseis"
"I Agapi Sou Den Menei Pia Edo"
"Pirotehnimata"
"Treli Kardia"
"Gigolo"
"To 'Heis I Den To 'Heis"
"Paradeigmatos Hari"
"You Set My Heart on Fire"
"Mi Fevgeis"
"Just Walk Away"
"Astra Mi Me Malonete" (Duet with Manos Pirovolakis)
"Teli Teli Teli" (Duet with Manos Pirovolakis)
"Lene Gia Mena" (Duet with Manos Pirovolakis)
"Ta Smirnaika Tragoudia" (Duet with Manos Pirovolakis)
"Dinata Dinata" (Duet with Manos Pirovolakis)
"Stis Ekklisias tin Porta" (Duet with Manos Pirovolakis)
"My Number One"
"Mazi Sou"
"The Light in Our Soul/To Fos sti Psyhi"
"Porta Gia Ton Ourano"

Tour dates

The tour dates were included in a promo CD which was distributed at the kick-off party, but officially they were announced by the radio station Sfera 102.2 fm which was one of the sponsors. Additional tour dates were added as the tour went into full swing. The last concert of the series was supposed to take place on September 22, but it was canceled due to inclement weather.

1 Paparizou performed at this venue as a part of Arda's Festival rather than a private concert.
2 3,300 audience members were indoors and 1,000 outdoors.
3 Paparizou performed at this venue as the opening act for the Enduro World Championship rather than a private concert.
4 The concert was canceled due to bad weather conditions.

Performers

Lead performers
Vocals: Elena Paparizou, Manos Pirovolakis

Guest Stars
 Stavento, Giorgos Sampanis

Dancers

Emy Zarian, Nikos Marianos, Giorgos Papadopoulos, Sandy Leulier, Stavriana Garnavou, Anna Athanasiadou

Band members
Musical director: Thanasis Hondros
Drums: Kostas Liolios (Konstantinos Liolios is a well-known professional drummer and one of the top musicians currently performing at Greece. Liolios have played with many known artists like Antonis Remos, Anna Vissi, Dimitra Galani, Eleutheria Arbanitaki, Elena Paparizou and many others. He is widely regarded as one of the most charismatic, youngest and talented drummers today.)
Percussion saxophone: Vasilis Tasopoulos
Bass: Thanasis Hondros
Guitar: Fivos Zaharopoulos
Keyboard piano: Giannis Kifonidis
Keyboard synthesizer: Kostas Lainas
Bouzouki tzoura: Evripidis Nikolidis
Bouzouki: Paschalis Karambourtzidis
Vocals: Marianna Gerasimidou, Paola Komini, Arlyn Gonzales
Vocal direction: Alex Panayi

Credits

Performance
 Director: Kostas Kapetanidis
 Art director: Fokas Evangelinos
 Instrumentation/arrangement: Thanasis Hondros, DONK (Niclas Oaulsson and Toni Mavridis)
 LED/lighting designer: Paris Anagnostopoulos
 Sound: Nikos Chronopoulos, Giannis Xidakis, Spathi Eleni
 Choreography: Fokas Evangelinos

Production
 Production arrangement: Andri Orfanidou/Galaxias Paragoges, Kostas Christopoulos/Four Seasons
 Production manager: Gerasimos Sideridis
 Tour manager: Konstantinos Bletsas
 Communications and public relations: Giannis Koutrakis, Hara Zafarika/Piarista O.E.
 Television production: OBVAM AGM
 Video operator and G-LEC engineer: Elias Binieris
 Technicians: Andreas Georgiou, Michalis Petridis, Giorgos Tikou, Alexis Paterlis, Alexis Petraï, Giannis Triandafyllou, Dinos Freskos, Babis Tsakoumatos, Dimitris Andriannos, Gouseff Chalil
 Editing: Tasos Bitsakakis
 Post-production: Art Factory

Personnel
 Make-up: Giannis Marketakis (effex+)
 Hair: Christos Kalaniotis (effex+)
 Styling: Al Giga (Elena Paparizou), Kostas Zisis (dancers)
 Backstage personal management: Filio Zioga, Vergos Michalis

References

External links 
 ElenaCentral page on tour

Helena Paparizou concert tours
2008 concert tours